The England cricket team toured Australia in the 1990–91 season to play a five-match Test series against Australia for The Ashes. The Australians were the holders, having reclaimed the Ashes in England during the 1989 Ashes series, however the 1986-87 Ashes series, which was the previous series in Australia had been won by England. The English tourists were confident their home series loss in 1989 had been a blemish and that they were more than capable of reclaiming the Ashes 'down under'. The tourists were seemingly well prepared. During their home summer they had 1-0 victories in 3-test series against both India and New Zealand, and had played well in their warm-up matches.

However the Australians, led by the authoritative Allan Border were in a ruthless mood. They had home series victories against Sri Lanka and Pakistan, but had lost a one-off test to New Zealand since the 1989 Ashes series victory, and Border and his men were determined to defend the trophy. The Australians came out aggressively from the start, and combined with moments of bad-luck for the tourists, proved too much pressure for the England side to handle. The five test series was won 3-0 by Australia. However, unlike the 1989 series, only the final test was an outright walkover: England showed considerably more fight than they had two years previously, and in fact narrowly had the better of the first innings in the first two Tests, but in each case suffered a second-innings batting collapse leaving Australia a comparatively small target to chase.  The third Test was almost a reverse of the first two, Australia taking a narrow first innings lead (England actually declaring while still short of the Australian total), but collapsing in the second innings: however, stalwart defence by their last two wickets held England up for a couple of hours on the last day, and left them with just not enough time to chase the runs.  And in the fourth Test, Australia took a large first-innings lead, and declared in their second innings to set England an improbably high target in the final innings: but they made such a good fist of the chase that the match could have swung either way if an extra day had been available.

Test series

1st Test

 Australia lead the five test series 1–0.

2nd Test

 Australia lead the five test series 2–0.

3rd Test

Australia lead the five test series 2–0.

4th Test

 Australia lead the five test series 2–0.

5th Test

Australia won the five test series 3–0.

External sources
 CricketArchive – tour itinerary

Annual reviews
 Playfair Cricket Annual 1991
 Wisden Cricketers' Almanack 1991

Further reading
 Chris Harte, A History of Australian Cricket, Andre Deutsch, 1993

References

The Ashes
1990–91 Australian cricket season
International cricket competitions from 1988–89 to 1991
Ashes series
Ashes series